The men's high jump event at the 2010 World Junior Championships in Athletics was held in Moncton, New Brunswick, Canada, at Moncton Stadium on 21 and 23 July.

Medalists

Results

Final
23 July

Qualifications
21 July

Group A

Group B

Participation
According to an unofficial count, 34 athletes from 26 countries participated in the event.

References

High jump
High jump at the World Athletics U20 Championships